Thomas Henry Blythe (16 September 1871 – 1944) was an English professional footballer who played as an inside forward.

References

1871 births
1944 deaths
English footballers
Association football inside forwards
Grimsby All Saints F.C. players
Grimsby Town F.C. players
Cleethorpes Swifts F.C. players
English Football League players